Fatal Games (originally known as The Killing Touch and also known as Olympic Nightmare) is a 1984 American slasher film written and directed by Michael Elliott and starring Sally Kirkland, Lynn Banashek, Sean Masterson, Michael O'Leary, Teal Roberts, and Spice Williams-Crosby. The film follows a mad slasher, wielding a javelin, killing off members of a high school gymnastics team.

Fatal Games was released in 1984 and received negative reviews.

The film shares many of its plot points with an earlier slasher film, Graduation Day (1981).

Plot
A seven member gymnastics team at the Falcon Academy of Athletics is up for the "Nationals". But before they can reach the competition, someone dressed in a black tracksuit and wielding a javelin begins killing the members. They must discover the killer's identity before the entire team ends up slaughtered.

Cast
Sally Kirkland as Diane Paine
Lynn Banashek as Annie Rivers
Sean Masterson as Phil Dandridge
Michael O'Leary as Frank Agee
Teal Roberts as Lynn Fox
Spice Williams-Crosby as Coach Drew
Melissa Prophet as Nancy Wilson
Angela Bennett as Sue Allen Baines
Nicholas Love as Joe Ward
Lauretta Murphy as Shelly
Michael Elliot as Dr. Jordine
Christopher Mankiewicz as Coach Jack Webber
Ed Call as Mr. Burger
Mel Klein as Annie's Father

Soundtrack 
The song "Take it All the Way" was composed for the film by Shuki Levy. The song was written by Levy and his then-wife, Dallas writer Deborah Shelton.

Release 
The film was released in America in 1984 by Impact Films, and was subsequently released on VHS by Media Home Entertainment as both Fatal Games and, an alternate title, Olympic Nightmare. As of February 2022, the film has not received a DVD or Blu-ray release.

Reception 
British review site Hysteria Lives! wrote a mixed review, stating that "Fatal Games is a real cheap production- but still not as cheap as the video extravaganzas of later years. For much of its running time it has the production values, editing and acting of bad porno- complete with a farting synth score, while praising the kills and climax, saying they was "fun" in a strictly campy way."

BleedingSkull.com wrote a mixed review, criticizing the film's bland direction and music, but praising its opening theme song.

References

External links 
 

1980s horror thriller films
1980s slasher films
1984 independent films
1984 horror films
1980s mystery films
1980s serial killer films
1980s teen horror films
American teen horror films
American slasher films
1984 films
Films scored by Shuki Levy
1980s English-language films
1980s American films